The BR-222 is a Brazilian federal highway that connects the cities of Fortaleza, in the state of Ceará, to Marabá, Pará. It has a total length of 1,819.8 km.

It passes through large urban centers, such as Fortaleza (where it has a small duplicated section of 14 km to the Fortaleza ring road), connecting economically rich regions, such as the southeast of the state of Pará with the rest of Brazil. In its current course, after the federalization of the Estrada do Rio Preto in the municipality of Marabá, it will integrate the mining regions into the national territory. The duplication of the highway is being carried out specifically by the federal government through the DNIT, between Caucaia and Porto do Pecém in Ceará.

References

Federal highways in Brazil